Stay Until Tomorrow is a 2004 American romantic comedy-drama film written and directed by Independent Spirit John Cassavetes Award winner Laura Colella. It stars Eleanor Hutchins, Barney Cheng, Alison Folland with supporting roles by Reena Shah, Patrick Clarke and Slava Mogutin. The plot follows Nina (Hutchins), a former teenage Soap opera star who returns to her hometown of Providence after an extended period of world travel. Filmed in Providence in the summer of 2003, Stay Until Tomorrow was produced by Amy Geller, Laura Colella and Fabrice Lorenceau and released in 2004.

Development
Stay Until Tomorrow was developed through Sundance Institute filmmakers/screenwriters lab in 2000.

Cast
Eleanor Hutchins as Nina
Barney Cheng as Jim
Alison Folland as Carla
Reena Shah as Sheila
Patrick Clarke as Patrick
Slava Mogutin as Andrei
Aaron Jungles as Mark
Eddie Bernard as Tonio
Paul Kaup as Jeoy
John Kenower as Todd
Pierre Poirot as Philippe

Filming locations
Providence, Rhode Island

References

External links
 

2004 films
2000s English-language films
American romantic comedy-drama films
2000s American films